Princeville School, also known as Princeville Graded Colored School, is a historic school for African-American students located at Princeville, Edgecombe County, North Carolina.  It was built between 1935 and 1940, and is a one-story weatherboarded building, eleven bays wide and two rooms deep, with a recessed front-gable center entrance.  It sits on a high brick pier foundation and has a hipped roof.  The school closed in 1960, and the building served as Princeville's town hall from 1960 until 1999.

It was listed on the National Register of Historic Places in 2001.

References

School buildings completed in 1940
Defunct schools in North Carolina
Historically black schools
African-American history of North Carolina
Historically segregated African-American schools in North Carolina
School buildings on the National Register of Historic Places in North Carolina
Buildings and structures in Edgecombe County, North Carolina
National Register of Historic Places in Edgecombe County, North Carolina